Harry Hein (born 1945 in Valga) is an Estonian military Major General. From 1991 he has been the chief director of Estonian Rescue Board. In 2000s he was the Director General of Estonian Border Guard.

References

1945 births
Living people
People from Valga, Estonia
Estonian major generals
Soviet Army officers
Frunze Military Academy alumni
Recipients of the Military Order of the Cross of the Eagle, Class II